Rosalind Keith (December 6, 1916 – February 24, 2000) was an American film actress.

After making 18 films for Columbia and Paramount, she became a singer billed as Rosalind Courtright.

Filmography

References

Bibliography
 Larry Langman & Daniel Finn. A Guide to American Crime Films of the Thirties. Greenwood Press, 1995.

External links
 

1916 births
2000 deaths
American film actresses
20th-century American actresses